The Men is a 1950 American drama film. Set mostly in a paraplegic ward of a VA hospital, the film stars Marlon Brando (in his film debut) as an ex-GI named Ken who as a result of a war wound is paralyzed and uses a wheelchair. Suffering depression and impaired self-concept, Ken struggles to accept his disability and his need to accept care from others, including from his fiancée/wife.

Directed by Fred Zinnemann, the film was written by Carl Foreman, produced by Stanley Kramer and co-starred Teresa Wright and Everett Sloane. It received generally favorable reviews and an Academy Award nomination for writing.

Plot 
The film opens with a printed Dedication:
In all Wars, since the beginning of History, there have been men who fought twice. The first time they battled with club, sword or machine gun. The second time they had none of these weapons. Yet this [second fight], by far, was the greatest battle. It was fought with abiding faith and raw courage and in the end, Victory was achieved. This is the story of such a group of men. To them this film is dedicated.
During World War II, U.S. Army Lieutenant Ken Wilocek is shot in the back by a sniper, injuring his spinal cord. In the years that follow, he faces a series of ongoing struggles in accepting his condition, in rehabilitation and in re-entering society. The film also focuses on the challenges facing Ken and Ellen, his fiancée, as individuals and as a couple, before and after they marry. It also highlights events in the lives of the other men in the VA hospital, from a wedding celebration to a sudden death from meningitis. Dr. Brock heads the team of doctors, nurses and physical therapists. Near the end of the film, when Ken accuses him of not understanding the difficulties threatening his marriage, Brock tells Ken about his own frustration: “I can never see a patient walk out of here, never. I can keep a man alive, but in his heart he feels I failed him. You feel that way don’t you? Took me a long time to get used to that.” He reveals that he began specializing in paraplegia 18 years ago, after his wife was injured in a car accident. “Paraplegia was a new field, then. At least she didn't have to suffer too long…I’d give anything I’ve got to know that when I go home I'd find her there, waiting for me, in a wheelchair.“ He can't promise that everything will work out with Ellen, but if she loves Ken, and he behaves, chances are good. Anyway, he says, Ken has a lot of living to do, and he has to do it for himself.

Ken drives to Ellen's parents' home, some distance from the hospital, takes out his wheelchair and goes up the steep brick front walk until a step blocks him. Ellen comes out. “You've come a long way,” she says. “Do you want me to help you up the steps?” He replies, “Please.” The film ends in a long shot of Ellen helping him to push his wheelchair into the house.

Cast 
 Marlon Brando as Ken Wilocek
 Teresa Wright as Ellen
 Everett Sloane as Dr. Brock
 Jack Webb as Norm
 Richard Erdman as Leo
 Arthur Jurado as Angel
 Virginia Farmer as Nurse Robbins
 Dorothy Tree as Ellen's Mother
 Howard St. John as Ellen's Father
 Many of the patients and staff at the Birmingham Veterans Administration Hospital” in Van Nuys, California, where much of the picture was filmed.

Production
According to TCM.com “In addition to Arthur Jurado, a real-life paraplegic who was given a sizable speaking role, many others from Birmingham Hospital were added to the cast, including Dr. Norman Karr, physical therapist Helen Winston and nurses Rhoda Cormeny and Eunice Newberry.”

In an October 16, 1949 New York Times article, “Grim Masquerade”, Gladwin Hill described how Brando was spending a month at the hospital, adding that writer Carl Foreman had spent longer than that. Before the film's release, Director Fred Zinneman wrote an article titled “On Using Non-Actors in Pictures” for the January 8, 1950, edition of The New York Times. He describes the process of working with the men and choosing those who would appear in the picture, especially Jurado. Zinneman wrote that “All of the situations and dialogue in the script of The Men were written by Carl Foreman from material that he picked up from the men themselves while spending weeks with them ...

Reception
The film was banned in the United Kingdom because of a scene in which Dr. Brock speaks to a group of wives, mothers, fiancées and girlfriends of patients. The subject of having children (and, by implication, sexual relations) with a paraplegic husband is discussed, and Brock tells them that the ability to beget children varies in individual cases, but was unlikely overall. (Late in the film, Ellen asks Dr. Brock about children—or more specifically, her parents' desire for grandchildren.)

Upon release, The Men received generally positive reviews, particularly for its screenplay. On Rotten Tomatoes the film has an approval rating of 77% based on reviews from 13 critics.
Bosley Crowther of The New York Times gave the film a positive review and wrote: "Stern in its intimations of the terrible consequences of war, this film is a haunting and affecting, as well as a rewarding, drama to have at this time." Variety also gave a favorable review, and noted: "Producer Stanley Kramer turns to the difficult cinematic subject of paraplegics, so expertly treated as to be sensitive, moving and yet, withal, entertaining and earthy-humored."

Brando's screen debut received much praise, and The Hollywood Reporter  acclaimed him as “an important new star in the Hollywood horizon." Variety saw it differently: "Brando fails to deliver with the necessary sensitivity and inner warmth which would transform an adequate portrayal into an expert one. Slight speech impediment which sharply enhanced his 'Streetcar' role jars here. His supposed college graduate depiction is consequently not completely convincing."

In 1950, The New York Times' Bosley Crowther covered the film in several articles.

Reissue
The film was reissued by National Telefilm Associates under the title Battle Stripe together with the 1943 Lewis Milestone film The North Star which was renamed Armored Attack.

Accolades

Carl Foreman was nominated for an Academy Award for Best Writing, Story and Screenplay.
The National Board of Review placed the film on its annual list of the ten best movies of the year.
The film is recognized by the American Film Institute in these lists:
 2005: AFI's 100 Years...100 Cheers – Nominated

See also
 List of American films of 1950

References

External links
 
 

1950 films
1950 romantic drama films
American romantic drama films
American black-and-white films
Films scored by Dimitri Tiomkin
Films about paraplegics or quadriplegics
Films directed by Fred Zinnemann
Films produced by Stanley Kramer
Films about veterans
Films set in hospitals
Films with screenplays by Carl Foreman
United Artists films
War romance films
American World War II films
1950s English-language films
1950s American films